Statistics of Swiss Super League in the 1917–18 season.

East

Table

Central

Table

West

Table

Final

Table

Results 

|colspan="3" style="background-color:#D0D0D0" align=center|17 March 1918

|-
|colspan="3" style="background-color:#D0D0D0" align=center|14 April 1918

|-
|colspan="3" style="background-color:#D0D0D0" align=center|5 May 1918

|}

Servette Genf won the championship.

Sources 
 Switzerland 1917-18 at RSSSF

Seasons in Swiss football
Swiss Football League seasons
1917–18 in Swiss football
Swiss